Fernando Orjuela Gutiérrez (born November 4, 1991 in Restrepo, Meta) is a Colombian cyclist, who last rode for UCI Professional Continental team . He was named in the startlist for the 2017 Vuelta a España.

Major results

2013
 2nd Overall Tour Alsace
2014
 6th Overall Vuelta Ciclista a Costa Rica
2017
 10th Overall Tour de Langkawi
2018
 1st  Mountains classification Vuelta a Asturias

Grand Tour general classification results timeline

References

External links

1991 births
Living people
Colombian male cyclists
People from Meta Department